The 2010 Lethbridge municipal election was held Monday, October 18, 2010 to elect a mayor and eight aldermen (at-large), and five of the Holy Spirit Roman Catholic Separate Regional Division No. 4's nine trustees (as Ward 2). The seven Lethbridge School District No. 51 trustees were acclaimed, five being incumbents. Since 1968, provincial legislation has required every municipality to hold triennial elections. Of the 69,863 eligible voters, only 24,522 turned in a ballot, a voter turnout of 35.1%, and an average of 5.9 aldermen per ballot. One seat was not filled at the swearing-in ceremony, as a result of Alderman-elect Bob Babki's death. The seat was filled following a by-election over three months later.

Results
Bold indicates elected, incumbents are italicized, and an asterisk indicates not sworn in.

Mayor

Aldermen

 Bob Babki died before being sworn into office.

Public School Trustees

Separate School Trustees

By-election
The 2011 Lethbridge municipal by-election was held Tuesday, February 1, 2011 to elect one aldermen at-large. On October 18, 2010, Bob Babki was elected to the eight alderman council, in the regular scheduled municipal election. He died on October 30, from a suspected heart failure, two days before he would have been sworn into office. Minister of Municipal Affairs Hector Goudreau wrote Mayor Rajko Dodic, and by extension all citizens of Lethbridge, on November 18, that because Alderman-elect Babki was declared elected, a by-election would be required. The Municipal Government Act requires the City to hold a by-election within 90 days of a vacancy, since the vacancy did not occur until the new council was sworn in on November 1, 2010, it would have been January 30, 2011 at the latest, the two day discrepancy was not explained on the City election website. Of the 68,294 eligible voters, only 8,843 turned in a ballot, a voter turnout of 12.9%.

References

2010
2010 Alberta municipal elections